John Travis was a former U.S. soccer player. He played for the Fall River, Massachusetts Ponta Delgada S.C. which won both the 1947 National Challenge Cup and National Amateur Cup. Based on these result, the U.S. Soccer Federation selected the club to act as the U.S. national team at the 1947 NAFC Championship. As a result, Travis earned two caps with the U.S. national team. In the first game, the U.S. 5-0 to Mexico and in the second, they lost 5-2 to Cuba.

References

United States men's international soccer players
Ponta Delgada S.C. players
Year of birth missing
Possibly living people
American soccer players

Association footballers not categorized by position